Pavel Kubiš (born March 17, 1985) is a Czech professional ice hockey player currently playing with HC Zlín in the Czech Extraliga.

Kubiš has been with Zíln since 2000 and made his debut for the senior team during the 2004-05 Czech Extraliga playoffs.

References

External links

1985 births
Living people
Czech ice hockey forwards
AZ Havířov players
SK Horácká Slavia Třebíč players
HC ZUBR Přerov players
PSG Berani Zlín players
People from Náměšť nad Oslavou
Sportspeople from the Vysočina Region